Dom Pedro II Bridge ((), also Dom Pedro II Imperial Bridge ) is a bridge between Cachoeira and São Félix, Bahia, Brazil. It crosses the Paraguaçu River and serves as an automotive, rail, and pedestrian bridge. The bridge was inaugurated on July 7, 1885, was one of the main engineering works in South America at the time.

Construction of the bridge opened rail traffic between Feira de Santana north of Salvador and the Chapada Diamantina in the interior of Bahia in the 19th century. The dual use of the bridge, however, for vehicle traffic and the Estrada de Ferro Central da Bahia (EFCBH) trunk line causes significant transportation bottlenecks in both Cachoeira and São Félix.

The central pillar of the bridge sits on a small island in the river. It is covered with vegetation and is considered a sacred space of the Candomblé religion.

Access

The bridge is open to the public and may be visited.

References

Buildings and structures in Bahia
Railway bridges in Brazil
Bridges completed in 1885
Road-rail bridges
Transport in Bahia